Zoran Stratev (born 16 July 1960) is a Macedonian football coach and former player. He was a former interim coach of the Macedonian national football team.

External links 
Profile at Soccerway

1960 births
Living people
Footballers from Skopje
Association footballers not categorized by position
Yugoslav footballers
Macedonian footballers
FK Makedonija Gjorče Petrov players
FK Ljuboten players
FK Rabotnički players
Macedonian football managers
FK Makedonija Gjorče Petrov managers
North Macedonia national football team managers
FK Vardar managers
FK Shkëndija managers
FK Rabotnički managers